The grey-rumped swiftlet (Collocalia marginata) or grey-rumped swiftlet, is a small bird in the swift family Apodidae. It is endemic to some islands in the Philippines.

Its natural habitat is subtropical or tropical moist lowland forests. It was previously considered a subspecies of the glossy swiftlet.

Taxonomy
The grey-rumped swiftlet was described by the Italian ornithologist Tommaso Salvadori in 1882 and given the current binomial name Collocalia marginata. The type locality is the island of Cebu in the Philippines. The specific epithet maginata is Latin for "bordered" or "edged". The grey-rumped swiftlet was previously treated as a subspecies of the glossy swiftlet but was promoted to species status based on the results of a detailed analysis of the swiftlets in the genus Collocalia published in 2017.

There are two subspecies:
 C. m. septentrionalis Mayr, 1945 – Babuyan Island, Cagayan Island, Camiguin Island
 C. m. marginata Salvadori, 1882 – eastern and western Visayan Islands, possibly Palawan

Description
The back and upper surface of the wings are dull dark blue with a moderate green gloss. The throat and upper breast are grey with fine white scalloping merging into larger greyish chevrons over the lower breast and flanks, becoming white over the belly. This species lacks the white spots on the inner webs of the tail feathers that are present in some Collocalia species.

References

grey-rumped swiftlet
Endemic birds of the Philippines
grey-rumped swiftlet
grey-rumped swiftlet